61st Street station is a SEPTA trolley stop in Philadelphia. It is located in the Angora neighborhood near where Baltimore Avenue (US 13) crosses Cobbs Creek into Delaware County. It is the western terminus of the SEPTA subway–surface trolley lines route 34. Trolleys run from here to Center City Philadelphia.

The trolley tracks in the station form a loop, nicknamed the Angora Loop, so that trains can enter westbound and depart eastbound. The loop circles around a Caribbean barbecue restaurant; it is across US 13 from a local playground as well as the Cobbs Creek Trail across 61st Street.

The Angora Loop lies a few blocks west of the Angora Regional Railroad Station, which serves the SEPTA Media/Wawa Line. No direct connection between the two systems are available at this stop, however.

References

External links

 Station from Google Maps Street View

SEPTA Subway–Surface Trolley Line stations
Railway stations in Philadelphia